Hulsey may refer to:

Corey Hulsey (born 1977), American football guard for the Detroit Lions of the National Football League
Hulsey Lake, located at 2630 m on the Apache-Sitgreaves National Forests
William Hulsey (1838–1909), American attorney, soldier, and politician who served as Mayor of Atlanta, Georgia

See also
Hulsey, Missouri